Gypsonoma contorta is a species of moth of the family Tortricidae. It is found in China (Shanghai) and the Russian Far East.

The larvae feed on Populus maximowiczii.

References

Moths described in 1966
Eucosmini